The 2006 Channel One Cup took place from 14–17 December 2006. Five games were played in Russia and one was played in Finland. The tournament was part of the 2006–07 Euro Hockey Tour.

Russia won the tournament before Finland.

Final standings

References

External links
Tournament on hockeyarchives.info

2006–07 Euro Hockey Tour
2006–07 in Swedish ice hockey
2006–07 in Russian ice hockey
2006–07 in Finnish ice hockey
2006–07 in Czech ice hockey
2006
December 2006 sports events in Europe
2006 in Moscow